Waterfall railway station was on the Cork and Bandon Railway in County Cork, Ireland.

History

The station opened on 12 June 1851. Regular passenger services were withdrawn on 1 April 1961.

Routes

Further reading

References

Disused railway stations in County Cork
Railway stations opened in 1851
Railway stations closed in 1961
1851 establishments in Ireland
1961 disestablishments in Ireland

Railway stations in the Republic of Ireland opened in 1851